A car song is a song with lyrics or musical themes pertaining to car travel. Though the earliest forms appeared in the 1900s, car songs emerged in full during the 1950s as part of rock and roll and car culture, but achieved their peak popularity in the West Coast of the United States during the 1960s with the emergence of hot rod rock as an outgrowth of the surf music scene. Though this popularity declined by the late 1960s, cars remain a frequently used subject matter in pop music into the 21st century.

Origins 
In the turn of the twentieth century, the recent invention of the automobile began to appear within popular music. Many of the earliest pieces had no lyrics, instead attempting to musically emulate the sounds of the automobile, such as "The Motor Car" (1903) and "The Auto Race" (1904). Dance, ragtime, and march compositions began emerging that, though wordless, were musically inspired by the automobile. Eventually, some of these songs took on words, such as Henry Krull's "Automobile Races". In 1905, Gus Edwards premiered the song "In My Merry Oldsmobile", a tune which Kenneth T. Jackson calls "the best-known car song ever written about the automobile."

Full development 
The car song began to emerge in full in the burgeoning rock and roll scene in the early 1950s. Jackie Brenston had a hit with "Rocket 88", attributed to Ike Turner, praising the Oldsmobile Rocket 88. Among the best known of the genre were "Hot Rod Race" by Arkie Shibley and His Mountain Dew Boys and the answer song "Hot Rod Lincoln" by Charlie Ryan.  Although the Johnny Mercer song "Skylark" was actually released in 1942, it became the inspiration for the Buick Skylark that debuted in 1953. Many 1950s songs could serve as soundtracks to play in one's car when approaching a drive-in restaurant or meeting someone. "Walk Don't Run" by the Ventures, "Rumble" by Link Wray, or "Sleep Walk" by Santo & Johnny could all serve a slow entrance, "Let's Go for a Ride" by the Collegians, "You Can't Catch Me" by Chuck Berry, or "Rebel-'Rouser" by Duane Eddy worked for a more speedy approach, and "No Particular Place to Go" by Chuck Berry worked for all situations. Many groups emerged that took their names from car brands: the Impalas, the El Dorados, the Cadillacs, the Fleetwoods, the Starfires, the Rivieras, Little Anthony and the Imperials, among numerous others.

Hot rod rock 

The muscle car craze, as well as the surge of interest in sports car racing, brought several cars referencing performance cars. The Beach Boys, already a highly successful rock band, tapped into the California cruising and drag racing culture, spearheading a short-lived rock music craze commonly referred to as "hot rod rock". Author Geoffrey Himes wrote "The music was only subtly different [from surf music]". According to The Ultimate Hot Rod Dictionary by Jeff Breitenstein: 

From 1961 to 1965, some fifteen hundred car songs were recorded. Alongside the Beach Boys, Jan and Dean, Ronny and the Daytonas, and the Fantastic Baggys all rose to the forefront of the scene. As in the 1950s, many groups adopted the names of car brands, but this time with a greater emphasis on hot rods, such as the GTOs and the T-Bones.

Some of the most popular car songs to emerge in this era include:

Later years
After the hot rod music period ended by the mid-1960s, car songs, though still frequent, did not enjoy the same level of popularity. Some key songs that have emerged since that era include the following:

See also
Teenage tragedy song

References

Bibliography
 
 
 
 
 
 
 
 
 
 
 
 

 
Song forms